Waishengren, sometimes called mainlanders, are a group of migrants who arrived in Taiwan from mainland China between the Japanese surrender at the end of World War II in 1945, and Kuomintang retreat and the end of the Chinese Civil War in 1949. They came from various regions of mainland China and spanned multiple social classes.  The term is often seen in contrast with benshengren, which refers to Hoklo and Hakka people in Taiwan who arrived prior to 1945 who had lived under Japanese rule.  The term excludes other ethnic Chinese immigrants (e.g. from Malaysia or Hong Kong) and later immigrants from mainland China.

Definition 

The formal definition of a waishengren was someone living in Taiwan whose ancestral home, which is passed down through one's father, was not in Taiwan.  By contrast, a benshengren was someone whose ancestral home was Taiwan.  By this formal definition, a person born in Taiwan whose father's ancestral home is not in Taiwan is considered a waishengren. Conversely, a person not born in Taiwan whose ancestral home is Taiwan (most notably Lien Chan) is considered a benshengren.  Ancestral homes were eliminated in official records (e.g. on identity cards, household registrations, and passports) in 1996, and replaced with place of birth, which ended the official distinction of waishengren versus benshengren since many waishengren were born in Taiwan.

Today, in practice the term broadly refers to the cultural group of people who migrated from mainland China to Taiwan starting in 1945 when the Republic of China took control of Taiwan after the Surrender of Japan at the conclusion of World War II, and into the 1950s during the retreat of the Republic of China to Taiwan and its aftermath.  Recent immigrants to Taiwan from China are not considered waishengren, but make up a separate social category.  Due to significant intermarriage between waishengren and benshengren families, it is difficult to precisely define the distinction in later generations.

Translations 

The terms waishengren and benshengren pose some interesting difficulties in translation; most academic literature uses the terms waishengren and benshengren directly.  The literal translation of waishengren is "extra-provincial people" while the literal translation of benshengren is "this-province people"; however, these translations are politically loaded since they arose in a historical context when the ruling Kuomintang actively claimed the entirety of China.

One English translation of waishengren is "mainlander", although some waishengren find this translation uncomfortable since many of them have lived in Taiwan their entire lives, and the term may lead to possible confusion with residents of the People's Republic of China.  Likewise, the translation of benshengren as "native Taiwanese" leads to possible confusion with Taiwanese indigenous peoples.

Demographics 
Due to the chaotic nature of the Kuomintang retreat to Taiwan, the exact number of waishengren is unknown.  Estimates vary regarding how many waishengren migrated, with most estimates ranging between 950,000 and 2 million, with 1.2 million being the most commonly cited figure in Taiwan. Newly declassified archival data yielded a population of 1,024,233 mainland Chinese immigrants in Taiwan and the Kinmen-Matsu military zones on September 16, 1956. Furthermore, the male to female ratio among the immigrants was 375:100.

There are several subgroups of waishengren based on how they migrated. About 26% of non-military waishengren arrived prior to the KMT military retreat.  This group consisted of elites, e.g. government officials, businessmen and intellectuals, as well as migrant workers from Fujian. Another significant category consisted of military personnel and their families, as well as soldiers who were press ganged or forcibly conscripted by the Kuomintang.  Another category consists of refugees, who were hastily evacuated during the Kuomintang retreat. Some others, such as Ma Ying-jeou, arrived in the years after the retreat, for example through Hong Kong.

About 40% of waishengren settled in the Taipei area, with another 25% settling in Kaohsiung, Keelung, Taichung and Tainan.

History 

Historically, waishengren elites dominated the government hierarchy during the martial law era on Taiwan; this, along with the corruption that occurred under Chen Yi's military government immediately following the Japanese surrender in 1945 and the subsequent 228 Incident, generated resentment among benshengren and was one of the main causes of the Taiwan independence movement.  Although no longer dominating the government, waishengren elites still make up a large fraction of bureaucrats and military officers.

On the other hand, many of the soldiers and refugees who arrived with the Kuomintang came without their families.  Finding themselves destitute in an alien land with no relatives, some of them turned to violent game or suicide. In the late 50s, waishengren crime rates were more than that of benshengren, and would not fall to benshengren levels until the 70s.  Likewise, suicide rates for waishengren were double that of benshengren during the 50s.    Violent crimes committed by waishengren vagrants caused fear and anger in the local benshengren, and the government often used public executions in to assuage the public, especially in extreme and publicized cases such as armed robbery, sex harassment, or murder.  The influx of poor waishengren also put enormous pressure on housing, and resulted in the illegal construction of a large number of shantytowns in Taipei.  On the other hand, waishengren elites with political connections could often obtain formerly Japanese-owned properties, sometimes at the expense of evicted benshengren who already lived there.

Starting in the 1970s, Chinese nationalist dominance of the government began to recede. This was due to a lack of a political or social theory that would justify continued Chinese nationalist dominance, meritocratic policies which allowed local Taiwanese to move up in the government, political establishment encouraged under Chiang government, and economic prosperity which allowed for social mobility for those outside of the political establishment.

Intermarriage and a new generation raised under the same environment has largely blurred the distinction between waishengren and benshengren.. Many benshengren women married waishengren often from retired military personnel who came as singles.

In the late 1990s, the concept of "the New Taiwanese" became popular both among supporters of Taiwan independence and Chinese unification in order to advocate a more tolerant proposition that waishengren, who sided with the Allies against the reluctant Japanese colony in Taiwan during World War II, are no less Taiwanese than benshengren. However it quickly became apparent that the notion of New Taiwanese meant different things to supporters of independence and unification. To supporters of independence, the concept of New Taiwanese implied that waishengren should assimilate into a Taiwanese identity which was separate from the Chinese one. By contrast, the supporters of Chinese unification seemed to believe that all Taiwanese (not just waishengren) should restore a previously marginalized Taiwanese identity without antagonizing a larger pan-Chinese identity.

See also 

 Demographics of Taiwan
 North–South divide in Taiwan
 Mainland Chinese

References 

Kuomintang
1940s in Taiwan
1940s in China
Chinese Civil War
Ethnic groups in Taiwan
Immigration to Taiwan
Han Taiwanese